Barthomley is a civil parish in Cheshire East, England. It contains 15 buildings that are recorded in the National Heritage List for England as designated listed buildings.  Of these, one is listed at Grade I, the highest grade, two are listed at Grade II*, the middle grade, and the others are at Grade II.  Apart from the villages of Barthomley and Englesea Brook, the parish is entirely rural.  Most of the listed buildings are houses or farmhouses, many being timber-framed and dating from the 17th century.  The exception are a church, a public house, and a former smithy.

Key

Buildings

References
Citations

Sources

 

Listed buildings in the Borough of Cheshire East
Lists of listed buildings in Cheshire